Sir John de Graham of Dalkeith, Abercorn & Eskdale (1278–1337) was a 13th-14th century Scottish noble.

John, born in 1278, was the son of Nicholas de Graham of Dalkeith and Abercorn and Mary de Strathearn.

He fought at the Battle of Bannockburn against the English on 23–24 June 1314 and as a result had his Northumberland estates confiscated. King Edward II of England denounced John as an enemy and rebel, and granted his Scottish lands to Hugh le Despenser. He signed the Declaration of Arbroath in 1320.

John died on 25 April 1337.

Family and issue
John married Isabella, and had the following known issue:  
Sir John de Graham, last of Dalkeith, Abercorn, and Eskdale, died without issue; resigned Dalkeith in favor of William Douglas of Laudonia 6 Jan 1343 
Sybilla de Graham, married Reginald de Mure, had issue. Abercorn passed to the Mure family.
Isabel de Graham, married Walter Stewart, 6th High Steward of Scotland as his second wife, had issue.
Margaret de Graham, married William Douglas, Lord of Liddesdale as his 1st wife.

Citations

References
Balfour, J. "The Scots Peerage", Vol VI, Edinburgh, 1906.
Calendar of documents relating to Scotland preserved in Her Majesty's Public Record Office, London
by Great Britain. Public Record Office; Bain, Joseph, 1826-1911; Great Britain. General Register Office (Scotland) https://archive.org/details/calendarofdocume02grea/page/476/mode/1up
Registrum Honoris de Morton. A series of ancient charters of the Earldom of Morton with other original papers by Bannatyne Club (Edinburgh, Scotland); Thomson, Thomas, 1768-1852; Macdonald, Alexander; Innes, Cosmo; https://archive.org/details/registrumhonoris02bann/page/45/mode/1up

1278 births
1337 deaths
Medieval Scottish knights
People from South Ayrshire
13th-century Scottish people
14th-century Scottish people
Signatories to the Declaration of Arbroath
John